The Jupiter Hammerheads are a Minor League Baseball team of the Florida State League and the Single-A affiliate of the Miami Marlins. They are located in the town of Jupiter in Palm Beach County, Florida, and play their home games at Roger Dean Chevrolet Stadium. Opened in 1998, the park seats 6,871 people. They share the facility with the Palm Beach Cardinals, also of the Florida State League.

On May 23, 2011, the Hammerheads gained national attention after playing in a 23-inning game against the Clearwater Threshers.

In 2012, the Hammerheads won the 2nd Half Division Title and went on to defeat the St. Lucie Mets in a decisive Game 3 of the Division Championship Series to capture their first ever Division title. Jupiter lost in the FSL Championship in the fifth and final game against the Lakeland Flying Tigers, despite holding a 2–1 lead after Game 3.

Season-by-season results

Roster

Notable alumni

Hall of Fame alumni

 Tim Raines (2001) Inducted, 2017

Alumni: Most Valuable Player

 Miguel Cabrera (2002) 11 x MLB All-Star; 4 x MLB Batting Title (2011-2013, 2015) ;2 x AL Most Valuable Player (2012,2013)

Alumni: Rookie of the Year
 Jason Bay (2001) 3 x MLB All-Star; 2004 NL Rookie of the Year
 Chris Coghlan (2007, 2011, 2013) 2009 NL Rookie of the Year
Jose Fernandez (2013) 2 x MLB All-Star; 2013 NL Rookie of the Year
 Rafael Furcal (2014) 3 x MLB All-Star; 2000 NL Rookie of the Year
Hanley Ramirez (2011) 3 x MLB All-Star; 2009 NL Batting Title; 2006 NL Rookie of the Year
 Dontrelle Willis (2002) 2 x MLB All-Star; 2003 NL Rookie of the Year

Notable alumni

Antonio Alfonseca (2005)
Josh Beckett (2002-2003, 2005) 2 x MLB All-Star
Aaron Boone (2007) MLB All-Star
 Milton Bradley (1998) MLB All-Star
Geoff Blum (1998)
 A. J. Burnett (2004) MLB All-Star
 Jamey Carroll (1998)
Wil Cordero (2003) MLB All-Star
Dee Gordon (2015) 2 x MLB All-Star; 2015 NL Batting Title
 Kevin Gregg (2014)
Jason Grilli (2003) MLB All-Star
 Edwin Jackson (2016) MLB All-Star
 Charles Johnson (2002) 2 X MLB All-Star
Josh Johnson (2004, 2008) MLB All-Star
 Andrew Miller (2008-2010) 2 x MLB All-Star
 Guillermo Mota (2005)
 Ricky Nolasco (2007)
 Carl Pavano (1998) MLB All-Star
 Brad Penny (2002, 2014) 2 x MLB All-Star
 Brandon Phillips (2001) 3 x MLB All-Star
 Martin Prado (2015) MLB All-Star
 Cody Ross (2007)
 Jarrod Saltalamacchia (2014)
 Aníbal Sánchez (2009) 2013 AL ERA Leader
 Giancarlo Stanton (2009, 2012–2013, 2015) 4 x MLB All-Star
 Jake Westbrook (1998) MLB All-Star
 Josh Willingham (2002)

References

External links
 

Baseball teams established in 1998
Montreal Expos minor league affiliates
Miami Marlins minor league affiliates
Sports in the Miami metropolitan area
Professional baseball teams in Florida
Jupiter, Florida
Florida State League teams